Vani P U college is an undergraduate college located in Belthangady Taluk, Dakshina Kannada District, Karnataka. The college was established in 2004 by Gowdara Yanne Okkaligara Seva Sangh, BelthangadyThe current principal is Shree Yadupathi Gowda.

Courses
The college offers undergraduate courses in science, arts, and commerce. The commerce stream includes subjects like Economics, Business-studies, Economics, Accountancy, and science stream include subject combination like PMCB (Physics, Chemistry, Mathematics, Biology), PCMCS (Physics, Chemistry, mathematics, Computer Science) etc

See also
Ujire
Belthangady
SDM College, Ujire
St. Theresa High School, Belthangady

References 

Universities and colleges in Mangalore
Schools in Dakshina Kannada district